Piggotts, also known as St Mark's Village, is a small township in Saint George Parish on Antigua island in Antigua and Barbuda. It had a population of 1,478 in 2001.

It is located in the north of the island, to the east of the capital city of St. John's.

History 
In the late 1850s and early 1860s a school was built in what is now Piggotts to provide education to the poorer residents of the nearby sugar estates of Carlisle, Fitches Creek, Weirs, Gunthorpes, Paynters and Cassada Gardens. This school was centrally located so all of the residents of the estates would have easy access to the school.

Circa 1864, Richard Albert Louden Piggott from Newgate Street in St. John’s City, moved to this area. Piggott had so many children, that the area eventually became known as “Piggotts Village”.

Rivalry with Osbourn 
The village had a rivalry with Osbourn Farm, especially in cricket. The two villages were separated by a gap, but when the affordable housing project Happy Hill was constructed from the 1950s to the 1970s, the villages became connected, and the rivalry slowly ended.

Geography
The town is landlocked and has no sea access, and borders the town of Osbourn.

Religion 
The town is home to the Antigua & Barduda International Islamic Society Masjid, one of the only mosques in Antigua and Barbuda, as well as
 Praise Tabernacle United Pentecostal Church
 New Life Assembly of God
 Church of God 7th Day
 Clare Hall Christian Union Church.

Demographics 
Piggots has six enumeration districts.

 31800 Piggott's Ville-Woods 
 40600 Piggotts-School
 40700 Pigotts Hill 
 40800 Piggotts-St.Mary's 
 40900 Piggotts-Moravian 
 41000 Piggotts-Central

Census Data

See also
 Sir Vivian Richards Stadium — located near Piggotts.

References

Scott, C. R. (ed.) (2005) Insight guide: Caribbean (5th edition). London: Apa Publications.

Populated places in Antigua and Barbuda
Saint George Parish, Antigua and Barbuda